Yuma Edo (born 30 November 1993) is a Japanese swimmer. He competed in the men's 100 metre backstroke event at the 2018 FINA World Swimming Championships (25 m), in Hangzhou, China.

References

External links
 

1993 births
Living people
Japanese male backstroke swimmers
Place of birth missing (living people)
20th-century Japanese people
21st-century Japanese people